Khristo Khristov (born 17 April 1951) is a Bulgarian fencer. He competed in the team sabre events at the 1972 and 1976 Summer Olympics.

References

1951 births
Living people
Bulgarian male sabre fencers
Olympic fencers of Bulgaria
Fencers at the 1972 Summer Olympics
Fencers at the 1976 Summer Olympics